Bote (Bote-Majhi) and Darai are mutually intelligible tribal dialects of Nepal that are close to Danwar Rai but otherwise unclassified. Its speakers are rapidly shifting to Nepali.

References

Indo-Aryan languages